The Life of Harry Dare is a 1995 Australian film about an aboriginal detective.

References

External links

The Life of Harry Dare at Creative Spirits
Review at SBS

Australian comedy films
1995 films
Films scored by David Hirschfelder
Films set in South Australia
1990s English-language films
1990s Australian films
Films about Aboriginal Australians